Swallowtails are the largest butterflies. They range in size from 2.5–6.4 inches (6.5–16.5 cm). There are about 600 species worldwide with about 31 species in North America. All swallowtails have tails on their hindwings (except the parnassians). Their flight is slow and gliding but, when disturbed, their flight can be quite strong and rapid. They like to feed on various flowers, dung, and urine, and males like to puddle on damp ground. Most male swallowtails locate females by patrolling, and some males perch. The eggs are round and usually laid singly on different kinds of host plants. The larvae have a reddish-orange forked gland, called an osmeterium just behind the head. When frightened, the larva thrusts the gland out releasing a foul odor that will sometimes deter a predator. Many young swallowtail larvae resemble bird droppings. The chrysalis of most species is brown or green and looks like a leaf or branch. It is held upright by a silken loop around the middle called a girdle. The swallowtails overwinter as a chrysalis.

Subfamily Parnassiinae: parnassians

 Clodius parnassian, Parnassius clodius
 Eversmann's parnassian, Parnassius eversmanni
 Phoebus parnassian, Parnassius phoebus
 Phoebus Phoebus parnassian, Parnassius phoebus phoebus
 Rocky Mountain parnassian, Parnassius phoebus smintheus
 Sierra Nevada parnassian, Parnassius phoebus behri

Subfamily Papilioninae: swallowtails

 Pipevine swallowtail, Battus philenor
 Polydamas swallowtail, Battus polydamas
 Cuban kite swallowtail, Eurytides celadon
 Guatemalan kite-swallowtail, Eurytides epidaus
 Dark kite-swallowtail, Eurytides philolaus
 Red-sided swallowtail, Mimoides phaon
 Ruby-spotted swallowtail, Papilio anchisiades
 Bahamian swallowtail, Papilio andraemon
 Queen swallowtail, Papilio androgeus 
 Appalachian tiger swallowtail, Papilio appalachiensis 
 Schaus's swallowtail, Papilio aristodemus 
 Broad-banded swallowtail, Papilio astyalus 
 Short-tailed swallowtail, Papilio brevicauda 
 Canadian tiger swallowtail, Papilio canadensis 
 Giant swallowtail, Papilio cresphontes 
 Pale-spotted swallowtail, Papilio erostratus 
 Pale swallowtail, Papilio eurymedon 
 Magnificent swallowtail, Papilio garamas 
 Eastern tiger swallowtail, Papilio glaucus 
 Indra swallowtail, Papilio indra 
 Ozark swallowtail, Papilio joanae Old World swallowtail, Papilio machaon
 Baird's Old World swallowtail, Papilio machaon bairdii
 Oregon swallowtail, Papilio machaon oregonius
 Two-tailed swallowtail, Papilio multicaudata
 Ornythion swallowtail, Papilio ornythion
 Palamedes swallowtail, Papilio palamedes
 Pink-spotted swallowtail, Papilio pharnaces
 Three-tailed swallowtail, Papilio pilummus
 Black swallowtail, Papilio polyxenes
 Desert black swallowtail, Papilio polyxenes coloro
 Western tiger swallowtail, Papilio rutulus
 Thoas swallowtail, Papilio thoas
 Band-gapped swallowtail, Papilio torquatus
 Spicebush swallowtail, Papilio troilus
 Victorine swallowtail, Papilio victorinus
 Chinese swallowtail, Papilio xuthus
 Anise swallowtail, Papilio zelicaon
 White-dotted cattleheart, Parides alopius
 Variable cattleheart, Parides erithalion
 Montezuma's cattleheart, Parides montezuma
 Zebra swallowtail, Protographium marcellus

References
 Jim P. Brock, Kenn Kaufman (2003). Butterflies of North America. Boston: Houghton Mifflin. .

North America
Pap